Flemming Knudsen (born 31 May 1946) is a Danish politician and former mayor from Aarhus. He was a member of Aarhus City Council between 1986 and 2009 and the mayor of Aarhus between 1997 and 2001. In 2009 he was elected for the council of the Central Denmark Region where he became a member of the business Committee. Flemming Knudsen has been involved with many local organizations, especially sports where he has been chairman of a local handball chapter between 1972 and 1980.

Life 
Flemming Knudsen was born in the Aarhus suburb Viby where he attended Rosenvangskolen and obtained the Mellemskoleeksamen in 1962 and Realeksamen in 1963. In 1969 he got a degree as a school teacher from Marselisborg Seminarium. In 1969 to 1970 he worked as a teacher at Vestergårdskolen and in 1970 to 1993 he was employed at Næshøjskolen in Harlev. In 1986 his political career got underway as he was elected to Aarhus City council. He has since served as mayor and in a number of public functions. Knudsen was married 25 July 2000 to Lisbet Lautrup Knudsen.

Political career 
 1959: Member of Social Democratic Youth of Denmark
 1964: Member of the Social Democrats
 1986–2009: Member of Aarhus City Council
 1990–1993: Chairman of the Social Democratic council group and political speaker  
 1993: Alderman for the 1. Department of the magistrate 
 1994–1997: Councillor for the 4. Department of the magistrate 
 1997–2001: Mayor of Aarhus Municipality
 2002–2005: Councillor for the 1. Department of the magistrate 
 2002–2005: Vice Mayor of Aarhus Municipality 
 2006–2009: Councillor for the magistrate department of Culture Service in Aarhus Municipality 
 2009: Elected to the region council for Central Denmark Region for the Social Democrats
 2010: Member of the business Committee in Central Denmark Region

See also 
 List of mayors of Aarhus

References

1946 births
Social Democrats (Denmark) politicians
People from Aarhus
Living people
Mayors of places in Denmark